The 2009 WNBA season was the 13th season for the Phoenix Mercury of the Women's National Basketball Association (WNBA). The Mercury won the WNBA Finals for the second time in franchise history. On June 6, the Mercury and LifeLock entered a multi-year marketing partnership to launch the first-ever branded jersey in WNBA or NBA history. A press conference was held at the NBA Store in New York City with Phoenix Mercury President and COO Jay Parry and LifeLock CEO Todd Davis to make the announcement.
The partnership ran through 2011, and the LifeLock name was on the front of Phoenix Mercury’s player jerseys and on warm-up suits. The Mercury and LifeLock ware the first to finalize such an agreement following the WNBA’s decision this off-season to make this opportunity available for its teams and sponsors. As part of the partnership, LifeLock offered a one-year complimentary membership to season ticket holders of all WNBA teams.

Off-season

Dispersal draft
Based on the Mercury's 2008 record, they picked 5th in the Houston Comets dispersal draft. The Mercury picked Sequoia Holmes.

WNBA draft
The following are the Mercury's selections in the 2009 WNBA draft:

Transactions
 July 17: The Mercury re-signed Penny Taylor.
 July 14: The Mercury waived Allie Quigley.
 June 3: The Mercury waived Alison Bales, Sha Brooks, and Laurie Koehn and claimed Ketia Swanier off waivers.
 June 2: The Mercury waived Yuko Oga.
 May 31: The Mercury waived Murriel Page.
 May 18: The Mercury signed Murriel Page.
 May 13: The Mercury waived Jessica Adair.
 April 30: The Mercury signed Laurie Koehn.
 April 20: The Mercury waived Kim Smith and A'Quonesia Franklin.
 March 26: The Mercury acquired Temeka Johnson from the Los Angeles Sparks in exchange for a first-round 2010 WNBA draft pick.
 March 20: The Mercury traded Barbara Farris to the Sacramento Monarchs in exchange for A'Quonesia Franklin and Kim Smith.
 March 16: The Mercury has withdrawn its qualifying offer to Belinda Snell.
 February 11: The Mercury signed Yuko Oga to a training camp contract.
 January 30: The Mercury traded Kelly Miller and LaToya Pringle to the Minnesota Lynx in exchange for Nicole Ohlde.
 January 21: The Mercury acquired Alison Bales from the Atlanta Dream in exchange for a second-round 2009 WNBA draft pick.
 January 7: The Mercury signed Brooke Smith to a training-camp contract.
 May 7, 2008: The Mercury acquired a third-round pick in the 2009 WNBA Draft from the New York Liberty as part of the Leilani Mitchell transaction.

Free agents

Additions

Subtractions

Roster

Season standings

Schedule

Preseason

|- align="center" bgcolor="bbffbb"
| 1 || May 27 || 2:00pm || @ Sacramento || 74-70 || Quigley (15) || Bonner, B. Smith (6) || Quigley (4) || ARCO Arena  6,339 || 1–0
|- align="center" bgcolor="bbffbb"
| 2 || May 30 || 10:00pm || Seattle || 61-58 || Johnson (13) || Brooke Smith (6) || Pondexter (6) || US Airways Center  2,421 || 2-0
|-

Regular season

|- align="center" bgcolor="bbffbb"
| 1 || June 6 || 10:00pm || San Antonio || NBA TVKMYS || 90-79 || Taurasi (25) || Bonner (11) || Johnson (9) || US Airways Center  13,582 || 1-0
|- align="center" bgcolor="bbffbb"
| 2 || June 10 || 10:00pm || New York ||  || 91-84 || Pondexter (26) || 5 players (5) || Johnson, Taurasi (5) || US Airways Center  5,080 || 2-0
|- align="center" bgcolor="ffbbbb"
| 3 || June 12 || 10:00pm || @ Sacramento ||  || 71-90 || Bonner (14) || Bonner (5) || Pondexter (4) || ARCO Arena  6,438 || 2-1
|- align="center" bgcolor="bbffbb"
| 4 || June 13 || 10:00pm || Sacramento ||  || 115-104 (OT) || Taurasi (31) || T. Smith (7) || Johnson (8) || US Airways Center  7,173 || 3-1
|- align="center" bgcolor="bbffbb"
| 5 || June 17 || 10:00pm || Minnesota ||  || 104-80 || Taurasi (38) || Bonner (10) || Pondexter (9) || US Airways Center  6,524 || 4-1
|- align="center" bgcolor="bbffbb"
| 6 || June 19 || 10:00pm || Los Angeles ||  || 89-81 || Pondexter (21) || T. Smith (8) || Johnson (7) || US Airways Center  8,255 || 5-1
|- align="center" bgcolor="ffbbbb"
| 7 || June 21 || 7:00pm || Seattle || NBA TVFSNA || 84-93 || Taurasi (25) || Pondexter (5) || Pondexter (6) || US Airways Center  6,181 || 5-2
|- align="center" bgcolor="ffbbbb"
| 8 || June 23 || 7:30pm || @ San Antonio || ESPN2 || 87-91 || Pondexter (26) || Taurasi (8) || Johnson (5) || AT&T Center  6,692 || 5-3
|- align="center" bgcolor="bbffbb"
| 9 || June 25 || 7:00pm || @ Washington ||  || 93-87 || Pondexter (24) || Bonner, T. Smith, Taurasi (8) || Johnson (6) || Verizon Center  9,808 || 6-3
|- align="center" bgcolor="ffbbbb"
| 10 || June 27 || 8:00pm || @ Minnesota || NBA TVFSNAFSN-N || 80-109 || Bonner, Pondexter (19) || Taurasi (8) || Pondexter, Swanier (3) || Target Center  5,911 || 6-4
|-

|- align="center" bgcolor="bbffbb"
| 11 || July 1 || 10:00pm || Seattle ||  || 91-83 || Pondexter, Taurasi (22) || Pondexter (11) || Pondexter (8) || US Airways Center  6,341 || 7-4
|- align="center" bgcolor="bbffbb"
| 12 || July 5 || 9:30pm || @ Los Angeles || NBA TVFSNAFSNW || 104-89 || Pondexter (21) || Bonner (10) || Taurasi (6) || STAPLES Center  9,872 || 8-4
|- align="center" bgcolor="bbffbb"
| 13 || July 8 || 10:00pm || Chicago ||  || 90-70 || Taurasi (22) || T. Smith (13) || Pondexter (6) || US Airways Center  5,597 || 9-4
|- align="center" bgcolor="bbffbb"
| 14 || July 11 || 10:00pm || @ Sacramento ||  || 107-105 || Pondexter (23) || Bonner, Taurasi (8) || Pondexter (8) || ARCO Arena  7,798 || 10-4
|- align="center" bgcolor="bbffbb"
| 15 || July 15 || 3:30pm || Sacramento || NBA TVFSNA || 100-81 || Taurasi (22) || Johnson (6) || Pondexter (15) || US Airways Center  11,590 || 11-4
|- align="center" bgcolor="bbffbb"
| 16 || July 18 || 10:00pm|| Detroit ||  || 97-90 || Pondexter (26) || Pondexter, Willingham (7) || Pondexter (8) || US Airways Center  8,288 || 12-4
|- align="center" bgcolor="ffbbbb"
| 17 || July 22 || 10:00pm || Minnesota ||  || 86-99 || Pondexter (28) || Bonner (10) || Johnson (6) || US Airways Center  7,360 || 12-5
|- align="center" bgcolor="bbffbb"
| 18 || July 26 || 4:00pm || @ New York ||  || 94-88 || Taurasi (34) || Taurasi (13) || Johnson (7) || Madison Square Garden  11,211 || 13-5
|- align="center" bgcolor="bbffbb"
| 19 || July 28 || 7:30pm || @ Connecticut || ESPN2 || 95-80 || Pondexter (29) || T. Smith, Taurasi (9) || Johnson (7) || Mohegan Sun Arena  7,739 || 14-5
|- align="center" bgcolor="ffbbbb"
| 20 || July 30 || 7:30pm || @ Atlanta ||  || 76-106 || T. Smith (15) || Taurasi (7) || Swanier (5) || Philips Arena  7,827 || 14-6
|-

|- align="center" bgcolor="bbffbb"
| 21 || August 1 || 8:00pm || @ Minnesota ||  || 87-74 || Taurasi (20) || T. Smith (7) || Willingham (5) || Target Center  6,631 || 15-6
|- align="center" bgcolor="bbffbb"
| 22 || August 4 || 10:00pm || @ Seattle ||  || 101-90 (OT) || Taurasi (19) || Pondexter, T. Smith (8) || Johnson (7) || KeyArena  6,728 || 16-6
|- align="center" bgcolor="ffbbbb"
| 23 || August 8 || 10:00pm || Indiana ||  || 83-90 || Taurasi (15) || Bonner, Taurasi (5) || Swanier (6) || US Airways Center  9,867 || 16-7
|- align="center" bgcolor="bbffbb"
| 24 || August 13 || 10:00pm || San Antonio ||  || 95-83 || Taurasi (29) || Bonner, Taurasi (6) || Taurasi (6) || US Airways Center  6,522 || 17-7
|- align="center" bgcolor="ffbbbb"
| 25 || August 15 || 8:00pm || @ San Antonio || NBA TVFSNAKMYS || 89-106 || Taurasi (21) || Bonner (5) || Johnson, Pondexter (5) || AT&T Center  8,933 || 17-8
|- align="center" bgcolor="bbffbb"
| 26 || August 18 || 8:00pm || @ Chicago ||  || 106-99 || Taurasi (27) || Bonner (10) || Taurasi (7) || UIC Pavilion  TBA || 18-8
|- align="center" bgcolor="ffbbbb"
| 27 || August 21 || 10:00pm || Washington ||  || 81-91 || Taurasi (16) || Bonner (7) || Pondexter (6) || US Airways Center  9,155 || 18-9
|- align="center" bgcolor="bbffbb"
| 28 || August 27 || 10:30pm || @ Los Angeles || NBA TVFSNW || 98-90 || Pondexter (26) || Bonner (9) || Johnson, Pondexter (6) || STAPLES Center  9,586 || 19-9
|- align="center" bgcolor="bbffbb"
| 29 || August 29 || 10:00pm || Connecticut || NBA TVWCTX || 95-84 || Taurasi (21) || Taurasi (9) || Taurasi (5) || US Airways Center  9,977 || 20-9
|-

|- align="center" bgcolor="ffbbbb"
| 30 || September 1 || 7:30pm || @ Detroit ||  || 99-101 || Pondexter (25) || T. Smith, Willingham (7) || Taurasi (6) || Palace of Auburn Hills  5,239 || 20-10
|- align="center" bgcolor="bbffbb"
| 31 || September 2 || 7:00pm || @ Indiana || NBA TVFSI || 106-90 || Pondexter (25) || Ohlde (7) || Johnson (6) || Conseco Fieldhouse  7,446 || 21-10
|- align="center" bgcolor="bbffbb"
| 32 || September 5 || 10:00pm || Atlanta ||  || 100-82 || Bonner (20) || Bonner (7) || Taurasi (7) || US Airways Center  10,424 || 22-10
|- align="center" bgcolor="bbffbb"
| 33 || September 10 || 10:00pm || @ Seattle  ||  || 92-84 (OT) || Taurasi (24) || Taurasi (8) || Pondexter (8) || KeyArena  9,089 || 23-10
|- align="center" bgcolor="ffbbbb"
| 34 || September 13 || 3:00pm || Los Angeles || ESPN2 || 78-81 || Johnson (14) || Willingham (7) || Taylor (4) || US Airways Center  12,968 || 23-11
|-

| All games are viewable on WNBA LiveAccess

Postseason

|- align="center" bgcolor="ffbbbb"
| 1 || September 17 || 9:00pm || @ San Antonio || ESPN2 || 91-92 || Taylor (18) || Taurasi (7) || Taylor (6) || AT&T Center  5,721 || 0-1
|- align="center" bgcolor="bbffbb"
| 2 || September 19 || 10:00pm || San Antonio || NBA TV || 106-78 || Taurasi (24) || Bonner (13) || Taurasi (5) || US Airways Center  7,267 || 1-1
|- align="center" bgcolor="bbffbb"
| 3 || September 21 || 10:00pm || San Antonio || ESPN2 || 100-92 || Taurasi (30) || T. Smith (8) || Taurasi (5) || US Airways Center  6,896 || 2-1
|-

|- align="center" bgcolor="bbffbb"
| 1 || September 23 || 10:00pm || @ Los Angeles || ESPN2 || 103-94 || Taurasi (28) || T. Smith (6) || Taurasi (6) || Pauley Pavilion  6,389 || 1-0
|- align="center" bgcolor="ffbbbb"
| 2 || September 25 || 10:00pm || Los Angeles || NBA TV || 76-87 || Taurasi (25) || Pondexter (7) || Taylor (5) || US Airways Center  7,628 || 1-1
|- align="center" bgcolor="bbffbb"
| 3 || September 26 || 10:00pm || Los Angeles || NBA TV || 85-74 || Taurasi (21) || Taurasi (7) || Taylor (4) || US Airways Center  7,226 || 2-1
|-

|- align="center" bgcolor="bbffbb"
| 1 || September 29 || 9:00pm || Indiana || ESPN2 || 120-116 (OT) || Pondexter, Taylor (23) || Taurasi (9) || Taurasi (6) || US Airways Center  11,617 || 1-0
|- align="center" bgcolor="ffbbbb"
| 2 || October 1 || 9:00pm || Indiana || ESPN2 || 84-93 || Taurasi (20) || Taurasi (7) || Johnson (5) || US Airways Center  16,758 || 1-1
|- align="center" bgcolor="ffbbbb"
| 3 || October 4 || 4:00pm || @ Indiana || ESPN2 || 85-86 || Pondexter (23) || T. Smith (10) || Pondexter (8) || Conseco Fieldhouse  18,165 || 1-2
|- align="center" bgcolor="bbffbb"
| 4 || October 7 || 7:30pm || @ Indiana || ESPN2 || 90-77 || Pondexter (22) || Willingham (8) || Pondexter (7) || Conseco Fieldhouse  18,165 || 2-2
|- align="center" bgcolor="bbffbb"
| 5 || October 9 || 9:00pm || Indiana || ESPN2 || 94-86 || Taurasi (26) || T. Smith (8) || Taylor (5) || US Airways Center  17,313 || 3-2
|-

Regular season statistics

Player statistics

Team statistics

Awards and honors
 Cappie Pondexter was named WNBA Western Conference Player of the Week for the week of June 29, 2009.
 Cappie Pondexter was named WNBA Western Conference Player of the Week for the week of July 6, 2009.
 Cappie Pondexter was named WNBA Western Conference Player of the Week for the week of July 13, 2009.
 Diana Taurasi was named WNBA Western Conference Player of the Week for the week of August 10, 2009.
 Diana Taurasi was named to the 2009 WNBA All-Star Team as a Western Conference reserve.
 Cappie Pondexter was named to the 2009 WNBA All-Star Team as a Western Conference reserve.
 DeWanna Bonner was named Sixth Woman of the Year.
 Diana Taurasi was named to the All-WNBA First Team.
 Cappie Pondexter was named to the All-WNBA First Team.
 Diana Taurasi was named Most Valuable Player.

References

External links

Phoenix Mercury seasons
Phoenix
Phoenix Mercury
Western Conference (WNBA) championship seasons
Women's National Basketball Association championship seasons